Governor Berkeley may refer to:

George Berkeley (civil servant) (1819–1905), Governor of the Leeward Islands in 1864 and Governor of the West Africa Settlements form 1873 to 1874
Henry Spencer Berkeley (1851–1918), Acting Governor of Fiji in 1889
Norborne Berkeley, 4th Baron Botetourt (died 1770), Colonial Governor of Virginia from 1768 to 1770
William Berkeley (governor) (1605–1677), Colonial Governor of Virginia from 1660 to 1677